The Pontevedra apparitions are the Marian apparition of Mary, mother of Jesus and her child, Jesus, that Sister Lúcia, the Portuguese seer of Our Lady of Fátima, reported receiving in December 1925, while living in a Dorothean convent in Pontevedra, Spain, and a visitation of the child Jesus by himself in February 1926, near the convent's garden.

First apparition

Eight years after the apparitions of the Blessed Virgin Mary in Fátima, Portugal, the last surviving seer, known with the religious name of Sister Lúcia, was living in a Dorothean nuns convent in Pontevedra, Spain.

According to Sister Lúcia, on December 10, 1925, she experienced a vision of the Holy Virgin and the Christ child. The Virgin Mary showed her a heart encircled by thorns, which she was holding in her hand. During this apparition, the child Jesus asked Sister Lúcia "...have compassion on the heart of your most holy Mother, covered with thorns, with which ungrateful men pierce at every moment, and there is no one to make an act of reparation to remove them."

At this point, the Virgin Mary is said to have set the parameters of the Five First Saturdays devotion. If one fulfilled these conditions on the First Saturday of five consecutive months, the Virgin Mary promised special graces at the hour of death.

The First Saturdays devotion had already been an established custom in the Catholic Church. On July 1, 1905, Pope Pius X approved and granted indulgences for the practice of the first Saturdays of twelve consecutive months in honor of the Immaculate Conception. This apparition at Pontevedra requesting the establishment of the devotion of the Five First Saturdays is reminiscent of the apparitions reported by Saint Margaret Mary Alacoque in the 17th century which led to the establishment of the First Fridays Devotion.

Second apparition
Later, Sister Lúcia reported that on February 15, 1926 while emptying a garbage can outside the garden, she saw a child she thought she recognized. After striking up a conversation with him, the child transformed into the Child Jesus, who then reprimanded Sister Lúcia for not doing more to promote the five First Saturdays Devotion.

See also
 Sanctuary of the Apparitions
 Our Lady of Fátima
 Sanctuary of Fátima
 First Saturdays Devotion

References

Sources
 University of Notre Dame

External links
 "Fatima in Sister Lucia's own words" – Free online version of the memoir book written by Sister Lucia, O.C.D.
 "Sister Lucia: Apostle of Mary's Immaculate Heart" – Free online version of the book written by Mark Fellows
 Communal First Saturdays Apostolate (CFSA)
 "How to make the Five First Saturdays" (in PDF format free to download)

Marian apparitions
Our Lady of Fátima